The 1961 Provincial Speedway League was the second season of the Provincial League.

Summary
Eleven speedway teams took part. Liverpool, Yarmouth and Bristol had all folded at the end of the previous season and Bradford were unable to take their place in the league after the construction of their new track was delayed. Exeter, Plymouth, Wolverhampton, Middlesbrough and Newcastle all re-opened their tracks and joined the league for the start of the season. Plymouth took on Bristol's riders and Bulldog nickname. Poole were champions, finishing seven points ahead of runners up Plymouth.

Final table

M = Matches; W = Wins; D = Draws; L = Losses; Pts = Total Points

Top Five Riders (League only)

Provincial League Knockout Cup
The 1961 Provincial League Knockout Cup was the second edition of the Knockout Cup for the Provincial League teams. Cradley Heathens were the winners.

First round

Second round

Semifinals

Final

See also
List of United Kingdom Speedway League Champions
Knockout Cup (speedway)

References

Speedway Provincial League
1961 in speedway